Mincle Mountain is a summit in the U.S. state of Georgia.

A variant name is "Mincie Mountain". The name is a corruption of "Mincey", the name of a local pioneer family.

References

Mountains of Lumpkin County, Georgia
Mountains of Georgia (U.S. state)